Tim Sahaydak (born June 1, 1977) is an American soccer coach and former player. He is currently associate head coach of the UCF Knights women's soccer program. As a player, he played several seasons in Major League Soccer (MLS) for Miami Fusion F.C.

Playing career
Sahaydak attended Liberty High School in Bethlehem, Pennsylvania where he was an All-State representative. While touring with a state team, he was in Moscow during the 1991 Soviet coup d'état attempt.

College career
Sahaydak joined the North Carolina Tar Heels men's soccer program on a scholarship in 1995. He left in 1997 after his sophomore year.

Professional career
After leaving college Sahaydak was signed as a Project-40 player, eventually being assigned to the Columbus Crew. From 1998 to 2000, he played matches for the Project-40 team in the United Soccer Leagues (USL) A-League. After two seasons with the Crew, he transferred to the Miami Fusion. Between 1999 and 2001, Sahaydak played 22 times for the Fusion.

Coaching career
Sahaydak took to coaching as co-head coach of the VCU Rams women's soccer program alongside his wife, former international player Tiffany Roberts. After six years with the Rams, he joined the UCF Knights women's soccer program as associate head coach again alongside his wife.

References

1977 births
American soccer coaches
University of North Carolina at Chapel Hill alumni
North Carolina Tar Heels men's soccer players
Miami Fusion players
Charleston Battery players
Pittsburgh Riverhounds SC players
VCU Rams women's soccer coaches
UCF Knights women's soccer coaches
Living people
Sportspeople from Bethlehem, Pennsylvania
Association football defenders
American soccer players